Urosalpinx haneti is a species of sea snail, a marine gastropod mollusk in the family Muricidae, the murex snails or rock snails.

Description
The length of the shell varies varies between 24 mm and 34 mm.

(Described as Urosalpinx rushii Pilsbry, 1897) The shell is shortly fusiform, thick and solid, white under a dull light brown epidermis. It contains about 6 whorls (?), the earliest whorl is convex and smooth, the rest sculptured and convex. The body whorl is convex and robust, excavated below. 

Sculpture : numerous low longitudinal folds, quite distinct and regular on the whorls of the spire, but subobsolete on the body whorl. The spiral cords number about 43 on the body  whorl, every fourth cord decidedly wider and more prominent, the middle one of the three intervening larger than the other two. On the spire, or in young specimens, the spirals are alternately larger and smaller.

The surface is roughened and minutely lamellose throughout. The long, oval aperture is pure white within, about three-fifths the total altitude of shell. The siphonal canal is contracted, narrow, considerably recurved, about one-third as long as the open portion of the aperture. The outer lip is thick, with about 7 low denticles within. The columella is straight and vertical. The umbilical chink is minute. The umbilical region is large, excavated, surrounded by a convex, prominent siphonal funicle. The operculum is very thin, with the nucleus near the base.

Distribution
This marine species occurs off Uruguay and Brazil.

References

External links
 Petit de la Saussaye, S. (1856). Description de coquilles nouvelles. Journal de Conchyliologie. 5: 87-92, pl. 2.

Urosalpinx
Gastropods described in 1856